The Sky's The Limit is a 1943 romantic musical comedy film starring Fred Astaire and Joan Leslie, with music by Harold Arlen and lyrics by Johnny Mercer. The film was directed by Edward H. Griffith, and released by RKO Radio Pictures. Astaire plays a Flying Tiger pilot on leave. Robert T. Smith, a real former Flying Tiger pilot on leave before joining the Army Air Forces, was the technical adviser on the film. The comedy is provided by Robert Benchley — his second appearance in an Astaire picture — and Eric Blore, a stalwart from the early Astaire-Rogers pictures.

The film was an unusual departure for Astaire, one which caused some consternation among film critics and fans at the time, though not enough to prevent the film from doing well. Aside from the dancing – which contains the famous solo performance to the standard "One For My Baby (And One More For The Road)", described by Astaire as "the best song specially written for me" – the script provided him with his first opportunity to act in a serious dramatic role, and one with which his acting abilities, sometimes disparaged, appear to cope.

Arlen and Mercer were nominated for the Oscar for Best Original Song, for "My Shining Hour". Leigh Harline was nominated for the Academy Award for Music (Scoring of a Musical Picture).

Plot
During World War II, Flying Tiger triple ace Lieutenant Fred Atwell and his almost-as-successful comrades, Reginald Fenton and Richard Merlin, are brought back to the United States for a ticker tape parade and a ten-day "leave." The only trouble is, they are expected to spend all their time on a nationwide morale-boosting tour. Fred sneaks off the train at a rural stop to seek some fun.

He eventually ends up in New York City. He spots a beautiful woman, Joan Manion, in a nightclub. Eavesdropping, he learns that she is a newspaper photographer fed up with taking pictures of celebrities. Her pleas for an assignment in a war zone fall on deaf ears. Her boss, newspaper publisher Phil Harriman, likes her just where she is: nearby so he can try to wear her down and persuade her to marry him.

Fred, giving himself the last name "Burton" to hide his identity, romances her himself in an annoyingly persistent way, even renting a room in the building she lives in. Eventually, she starts to like him, despite what she considers to be a lack of ambition on his part; he does not seem to have or want a job.

She lets him take her on a date, though she steers him into a crowded canteen where she does volunteer work entertaining servicemen. When a performer cancels on short notice, Joan is recruited to sing a number. Fred invites himself to sing along and dance with her; in the process, he runs into his fellow pilots. While Richard dances with Joan, Reginald amuses himself by blackmailing Fred into doing a snake dance on the table in exchange for not revealing who he really is.

Joan tries hard to get Fred a job. When she learns that he once worked as a reporter, she arranges an interview with Phil. Fred, with his leave running out, instead spends the time giving Phil pointers on how to win Joan over, even setting up a romantic dinner at Phil's penthouse with the assistance of his butler, Jackson. Phil blunders badly, then reveals to Joan what Fred has been up to.  Fred's scheme works, and he ends up dining for the evening with Joan, in Phil's penthouse. Joan pours on the charm and proposes marriage to Fred, leaving him in an uncomfortable position.

Later, Reginald informs Fred that their leave has been cut short; they only have two more days. Since Fred still does not have a job, Joan takes him along to a banquet honoring airplane manufacturer Harvey J. Sloan. She introduces Fred to Mr. Sloan, but instead of making a good impression as he had promised, he criticizes the fighter plane's performance built by Sloan. When Joan finds out, she breaks up with him.

Afterward, Phil invites Fred to a nearby bar, where he reveals to Fred that he has found out his true identity. Fred asks him to keep it a secret.  Fred proceeds to get drunk, singing to bartenders while bar-hopping, "One for My Baby," even tapdancing on a bar table and breaking dozens of drinking glasses in the process.

The next day, Phil makes one last attempt to get Joan to marry him. When that fails, he sends her to the airfield to take pictures of pilots returning to the fight in the Pacific, knowing Fred would be there. Here she spots Fred in his uniform, where it all becomes clear to her. The two embrace, and Fred professes his love to Joan, just after he boards the plane for takeoff.

Cast

Production

Development
The story line was taken from a Saturday Evening Post story about an attractive young woman from Texas who was an assistant/employee/(lover?) of an older man prominent in New York City literary circles. In the story, the young woman leaves her glamorous job to marry a young man who is going off to World War II. This character is altered a good bit to fit Fred Astaire in the movie.

Music
All dances were choreographed by and credited to Astaire alone, an unusual departure for him, as he generally worked with collaborators. What is not unusual is the selection of dance routines, which is the standard Astaire formula of a comic partnered routine, a romantic partnered routine and a "sock" solo, each of which is integrated into the plot.

 "My Shining Hour" (song): Arlen and Mercer's simple and hymn-like wartime ballad, the picture's signature song, is mimed by Joan Leslie (dubbed here by Sally Sweetland) against the backdrop of a band whose instruments are framed with illuminated neon outlines. It became a hit, albeit slowly.
 "A Lot In Common With You": Astaire muscles in on Leslie's (using her own voice this time) on-stage song-and-dance routine, which develops into a mock competitive comic side-by-side tap dance using a range of leg-before-leg hurdling steps, some of which had been developed for "The Shorty George" number in You Were Never Lovelier, but had not been used. The song also makes reference to recent musicals by Leslie and Astaire by name-dropping both James Cagney and Rita Hayworth, respectively Leslie's partner in Yankee Doodle Dandy from the previous year and Astaire's partner in You'll Never Get Rich from 1941 and the aforementioned You Were Never Lovelier in 1942.
 "My Shining Hour" (dance): This is a partnered ballroom-style romantic dance.
 One For My Baby (And One More For The Road)": The number took two and a half days to shoot, after seven days of full set rehearsal. After a drunken rendition of the song, he furiously tap dances up and down the bar, pausing only to smash stacked racks of glasses and a mirror. Astaire's first drunk dance was the comic routine "You're Easy To Dance With" in Holiday Inn, but this solo marks his first clear departure from a carefully crafted screen image of urbane charm.
 The tabletop snake dance: Performed by Astaire at the behest of Robert Ryan's character.

Reception

Box office
According to RKO records, the film earned $1,410,000 in the U.S. and Canada and $775,000 elsewhere, resulting in a profit of $625,000.

It was released in France in 1945 and recorded admissions of 671,864.

References
Notes

Bibliography
Fred Astaire: Steps in Time, 1959, multiple reprints.
Joan Leslie in Icons Radio - Interview with John Mulholland, June 10, 2007. 
John Mueller: Astaire Dancing - The Musical Films of Fred Astaire, Knopf 1985,

External links
 
 
 
 
 

1943 films
American romantic musical films
American aviation films
American black-and-white films
1940s English-language films
Films based on short fiction
Films directed by Edward H. Griffith
Films set in New York City
Films shot at Pinewood Studios
Flying Tigers in fiction
World War II films made in wartime
Films scored by Leigh Harline
RKO Pictures films
1940s romantic musical films
American romantic comedy-drama films
1940s musical comedy-drama films
American musical comedy-drama films
1940s romantic comedy-drama films
World War II aviation films
1943 comedy films
1943 drama films